Nickolas Gene Carter (born January 28, 1980) is an American singer and a member of the vocal group Backstreet Boys. As of 2015, Carter has released three solo albums, Now or Never, I'm Taking Off and All American, during breaks between Backstreet Boys schedules, and a collaboration with Jordan Knight titled Nick & Knight. He has made occasional television appearances and starred in his own reality shows, House of Carters and I (Heart) Nick Carter.

Early life
Carter was born in Jamestown, New York, where his parents, Jane Elizabeth (née Spaulding, previously Carter) and Robert Carter, owned a bar called the Yankee Rebel in Westfield, New York. He has English, Welsh, Irish, and German ancestry. Several years later, when Carter was four, the family moved to Ruskin, Florida, near Tampa, and managed the Garden Villa Retirement Home, where they added to the family. Carter's siblings include Leslie Carter (1986–2012) and Aaron Carter (1987–2022).

Career

Growing up, Carter began his acting and singing career at a young age when his mother heard him outside and enrolled him in voice lessons with a voice teacher named Marianne Prinkey. She later got him dance lessons in ballet, tap and hip hop at Karl and DiMarco's School of Theatre and Dance when he was 10. He also did several commercials, such as the Florida State Lottery and The Money Store, talent shows, and the Florida State Fair, auditioned for several acting roles in the late 1980s and early 1990s, and performed around Tampa Bay, FL. As a kid, he described himself as the weird kid, whose friends were the elderly, and was consistently picked on a lot until fourth grade, after his family moved to Apollo Beach, Florida. His first role was the lead role in the fourth-grade production of Phantom of the Opera at Miles Elementary School. His performance was so energetic that he received a standing ovation, with people crying in the audience at how wonderful the boy's voice projected. He also did an educational video called "Reach For a Book," a show called "The Klub" and performed at the Tampa Bay Buccaneers home games for two years. He also made an appearance in the 1990 Tim Burton film Edward Scissorhands as a child playing on a Slip 'N Slide. He stated, "It would be going too far to say I was actually in Edward Scissorhands because I was so far in the background that you can't tell it's me. It would be better to say I was on the set of the film... I was in the scene when Edward looks out of a window to the neighborhood. For a split second, he sees some kids playing - one of them was me. I was sliding on a yellow piece of plastic we used to call a Slip n' Slide. They were long flat sheets with water coming out of holes and were popular with kids at the time. I had to slide on one in the background of a shot. It was great fun being on the set but it was really cold and they made us do it a lot of times".

One of his dance teachers, Sandy, placed him in his first group called "Nick and the Angels." Between 1989 and 1993, Carter recorded various popular songs, including "Breaking Up Is Hard to Do" and "Uptown Girl" and a few original songs that he would perform at events. These recordings appeared on an unofficial release called Before the Backstreet Boys 1989–1993 by Dynamic Discs, Inc., released in October 2002. It was revealed that through several auditions, Carter met AJ McLean and Howie Dorough and they became friends.

He and his siblings grew up in an unconventional, dysfunctional family. He had a rough childhood due to his parents constantly fighting and screaming violently at each other. The friends that he had growing up were either dead, drug addicts, or in prison, and eventually, performing was Carter's most giant escape from his problems. At age 12, he put in a winning performance on the 1992 New Original Amateur Hour.

Backstreet Boys

At 12 years old, Carter auditioned for Disney's The Mickey Mouse Club and the Backstreet Boys. He was asked to join the group and was given the choice of either joining The Mickey Mouse Club with a $50,000 contract or this new music group. Carter chose to go with the group rather than the Mickey Mouse Club. After he joined the group, he had his own personal tutor on tour. In 2013 or 2014, Carter received his GED as shown on I Heart Nick Carter. At 13 years old, Carter, AJ McLean, Brian Littrell, Howie Dorough, and Kevin Richardson formed the vocal group the Backstreet Boys on April 20, 1993. Carter is the youngest member. The Backstreet Boys have recorded several albums, beginning in the mid-1990s, the latest being 2019's DNA. In March 2016, the group announced that they would begin an exclusive headlining residency at Planet Hollywood in Las Vegas called Backstreet Boys: Larger Than Life.

Solo career
In 2002, when the Backstreet Boys expressed a strong desire to leave their management company, The Firm, Carter was the first member of the group to choose to remain with them to manage his solo career and work on a solo album. Around then, Carter started writing songs and recording during his downtime when Jive asked him to do a solo album. As the group began recording their new album without him, he started working on his first solo album. In September 2002, Carter released the first single from his solo album, "Help Me" which did well on radio countdowns landing at #1 on various stations including New York City's Z100 and achieved considerable worldwide success while the other single, "I Got You" was a minor hit in Europe. On October 29, 2002, his first solo album Now Or Never was released and sold over 500,000 copies in the first week. It reached No. 17 on the  Billboard 200 charts and was certified gold, both in the United States and Canada. The album made the charts in many countries as well. He also launched a worldwide tour in support of the album. He was No. 9 of People magazine's "50 Most Beautiful People" in 2000 and was voted by readers of teen magazine Cosmogirl'''s "Sexiest Man in the World" in their October 2002 issue, beating out such competition as actor Brad Pitt and rival pop star Justin Timberlake for the title, launching a media-hyped "rivalry" between Timberlake and Carter, culminating in an amicable 2009 meeting off-camera on the set of Late Night with Jimmy Fallon where Carter defeated Timberlake in an arm-wrestling match. He was also featured on the cover of the magazine.

Carter went on tour in early 2003, where he performed at smaller venues like clubs. Much smaller venues than what he had been used to with Backstreet Boys. That same year Carter started working on his second solo album, but that was put on hold when the Backstreet Boys returned to the studio to record a new album in 2004. One of the tracks from the earlier recording sessions was used as the theme song to the television series House of Carters in 2006. "Let It Go" was written by Carter, Matthew Gerrard, and Bridget Louise Benenate. It would be 8 years before Carter finally focused on another solo album. Carter started to work on the album in 2008, but most of the recording of his second solo album, "I'm Taking Off," took place during any downtime he had in between Backstreet Boys touring in 2010. "I'm Taking Off" was first released on February 2, 2011, in Japan and later released in the U.S. on May 24, 2011, on iTunes only. The album was later released in other countries on different dates. It was Carter's first solo album without the help of a major label. He co-wrote every song released except a bonus track in Japan. In Germany, the album was released by Glor, Canada 305 Records, and in Japan, AMEX.

Carter recorded a duet with pop singer Jennifer Paige called "Beautiful Lie" in 2009. In 2010, Carter started recording new songs for his second solo album, working with Rami Yacoub, Carl Falk, Toby Gad, Josh Hoge, and Claude Kelly, among many others. Carter's new album titled I'm Taking Off was released on February 2, 2011, in Japan, in Germany on June 3, 2011, and in the USA via iTunes on May 24. As of June 2011, Carter's second solo album reached No. 8 in Japan, selling over 20,000 copies.

In January 2014, Carter recorded a duet album with Jordan Knight from fellow boy band New Kids on the Block. They both worked on a duet album and called their collaboration Nick & Knight, which debuted at #24 on the US Billboard 200 and #14 in Canada. The tour to support the album ran from September–November 2014. They announced their album and tour on April 30 on Good Morning America. The self-titled album was released on September 2, 2014. Fans were able to get a taste of the album when they pre-ordered it by receiving a download of the song "Just the Two of Us." The first single, "One More Time," was released on July 15, 2014. The album features a few tracks written by Carter and Jordan.

In 2015, Carter announced he would be working on a third solo album for release later that year. The album was called All American and was released digitally on November 25 via iTunes, Amazon, and Google Play. The CD release was delayed until February 2016 and released in Japan that same month. For most of the album, he worked with Dan Muckala, Natasha Bedingfield, and others. This album would see Carter returning to a pop/rock sound like Now or Never. Some tracks on the album also sound like the 1950s and 1960s. The first single from his new album, entitled "I Will Wait", was released on October 1, 2015, on Vevo and is an acoustic ballad. The new CD All American, was released on November 25, 2015. In support of the album, Carter toured in February and March 2016. Canadian pop/rock singer Avril Lavigne is also featured on Carter's album. She sings with him in the song "Get Over Me".

During the COVID-19 pandemic, Carter announced that he would be releasing new solo projects.

Acting career
Carter also did some acting appearing on various TV shows, including the NBC show American Dreams in 2002 and ABC's 8 Simple Rules in 2003. In October 2004, he even starred as a High School football player Brody in the ABC Family Halloween special, The Hollow, opposite Kevin Zegers. The film first premiered on ABC Family during their 13 Nights of Halloween in October 2004. The film was edited for TV and younger audiences. It was initially a rated R film. The rated-R movie was later released on DVD. But it would be a few years before Carter did any acting again as the Backstreet Boys worked on their return to music in 2004.

In 2007, Carter filmed the independent movie Kill Speed with Brandon Quinn, Andrew Keegan, Natalia Cigliuti, Greg Grunberg, and Reno Wilson, where he played a character named Foreman. The movie was originally scheduled for release in 2008, but due to issues with the release (some say with distribution), it would years before it was eventually released on DVD. In the US, its release was on June 12, 2012. While in the UK, its release was in 2010, along with some other countries. On May 8, 2012, he made a guest appearance on CW's 90210 and played himself. He's currently trying to do more acting. Carter made his big-screen debut in 2013, appearing in the comedy This Is the End along with the rest of the Backstreet Boys.

Carter has gotten into writing screenplays and filming/directing movies. The first film he directed was a movie he had written called The Pendant in 2010. It was a short 15-minute film and can be purchased on his official website. Unfortunately, the only public viewing of the film was at the Royal Theater in Toronto on August 13, 2010. However, fans could see the film by buying tickets through his official site. He also directed another movie in 2012, but no word when that will be released. 

In July 2013, Carter launched a campaign on Indiegogo.com, a crowdfunding site, to raise money for his movie "Evil Blessings." The goal was to raise $85,000. Instead, the campaign raised $156,214. Carter has said he'll use his money and the money raised to fund the movie. In return for the donations, multiple perks depended on how much you donated. They included chats with Carter on Skype, your name in the movie credits and/or website, movie merchandise (t-shirt, poster, DVD, etc.), acting roles, tickets to the premiere, tickets to BSB concerts, an online concert, and much more. Carter wrote the screenplay for the film. Due to a few setbacks, the film was delayed and put on hold. In July 2013, the director of the movie died. The film was said to start filming in June 2014, but the success of the Backstreet Boys' In a World Like This Tour delayed filming and was pushed back to January 2015. That gave Carter some more time to rework the screenplay. In October 2014, Carter announced that this film would be postponed due to the director's death. Instead, he'll film a new movie called "Dead West" in January 2015. The money donated to "Evil Blessings" will be used for this film. Carter hired the production company, the Asylum (the company that produced Sharknado), to help. In July 2015, Carter announced that the movie was renamed "Dead 7" to give it a more global appeal. "Dead 7" includes various members of different boy bands.

At Comic-Con 2015 in San Diego, Carter revealed his plans to film a movie he had written and would be directing and starring in. Entitled Dead 7, the film focuses on a ragtag band of gunslingers operating during a post-apocalyptic zombie plague. The film also stars Carter's wife, Lauren, and his bandmates Howie D. and AJ McLean. Besides NSYNC's Joey Fatone and Chris Kirkpatrick, O-Town's Erik-Michael Estrada, Jacob Underwood, and Trevor Penick, and 98 Degrees' Jeff Timmons will also star in the movie. The film also includes Jon Secada, Geraldo (a rapper remembered for the song Rico Suave), Art Alexakis (Everclear), and Debra Wilson (MadTV cast member), plus many more. The movie was filmed in Butte, Montana, in August 2015 and finished in early September, and the movie aired on the SyFy network on April 1, 2016.

Reality TV career
In 2006, Carter and his siblings starred in their reality television show, House of Carters, which premiered on October 2, 2006, on E!. The series features all five Carter siblings reuniting to live in the same house together in Los Angeles to try to reconnect as a family and get their lives together, as well as in-depth moments of their ups and downs. Their father, Robert Carter, and stepmother, Ginger, also appeared on the show. The series lasted one season, and eight episodes were aired.

In 2014, Carter returned to reality TV, and he and his wife (then fiancée at the time), Lauren Kitt, starred in their VH1 reality show, I Heart Nick Carter, which centered around the planning of their April 2014 wedding and premiered on September 10, 2014, on VH1. The show only had eight episodes and documented Carter's life as he prepared to get married. This included Carter trying to set the wedding date between Backstreet Boys touring, as well as footage of Carter working. Recording a new album with New Kids on the Block member Jordan Knight, various events such as a book signing, charity event, touring with Backstreet Boys in Europe (other group members also appeared on the show), his bachelor party, and much more. The wedding aired in a one-hour season finale. Carter announced on Twitter that VH1 did not renew the show for a second season.

On August 26, 2015, it was revealed that Carter would be taking part in the 21st season of Dancing with the Stars which began on September 14, 2015. He was paired with professional dancer Sharna Burgess. Carter and Burgess made the finals of the show and came in second place, behind Bindi Irwin and Derek Hough. He performed "I Will Wait" off his All American album live at the finale.

In June 2017, Carter appeared alongside Emma Bunton and Timbaland as a judge on a new singing competition show called Boy Band.

In 2020, Carter competed as the "Crocodile" on the fourth season of The Masked Singer, finishing in third place.

Power boat racing
In 2002, Carter got into power boat racing and started his own team, Nick Carter Racing, which won the National Championship in its first year.

Charity work
Carter started Oceans Campaign in 2001 to help raise awareness about the ocean. It was a part of the Just Within Reach foundation that fellow group member Kevin Richardson founded. He was announced as the new United Nations Special Ambassador for the Year of the Dolphin (YoD) on May 17, 2007, representing the United Nations Environment Program, the Convention on Migratory Species, and the Whale and Dolphin Conservation Society. 

The Year of the Dolphin campaign aimed to raise awareness of dolphins in the wild, the threats they faced to their survival, and actions that could help their wild conservation. He was to record a new song and video with all proceeds going to this project, make a public service announcement and appear at local schools. 

Carter has stated that he has a passion for the environment and its oceans. He has worked with the United Nations Environmental Program (UNEP) and the Coral Reef Action Network (ICRAN). He also has lobbied for these causes at Capitol Hill. In 2016, Carter sold two of his paintings on eBay, where a portion of the proceeds went to the St. Jude Children's Hospital. Carter has also auctioned various items over the years for charities.

Personal life
Relationships
Carter has been reported to have dated Debra Lafave, Willa Ford, and Paris Hilton.

Carter met Lauren Michelle Kitt, a fitness trainer, in 2008. They married in Santa Barbara, California, in 2014. Their wedding was featured in an issue of In Touch Weekly and was filmed for Carter's reality show, I Heart Nick Carter. They have three children; a son born in 2016 and two daughters born in 2019 and 2021. In September 2018, Carter revealed that Kitt had a miscarriage. They had been expecting a girl. Carter told People magazine that even though he loves performing on tour, he had to miss his daughter's third birthday to go to Europe.

Legal issues
On January 2, 2002, Carter was arrested at Pop City nightclub in Tampa, Florida, and charged with a misdemeanor count of resisting/opposing a law enforcement officer without violence.

In 2003 or 2004, Carter got his first DUI after refusing to comply with the police.

On March 5, 2005, Carter was arrested in Huntington Beach, California, and charged with one count of driving under the influence and one count of driving with a blood-alcohol level above 0.08, the legal limit. Carter pled guilty to the charges and was ordered to pay $1,200 in fines, was placed on three years of informal probation, had his driving privileges restricted for 90 days, and was required to complete a three-month alcohol education program.

On January 13, 2016, Carter was arrested at Hog's Breath Saloon in Key West, Florida after he was refused service at the bar due to "high levels of intoxication." Carter was asked to leave by management and, after getting into a physical altercation with the bar's bouncers, was charged with misdemeanor battery.

In September 2019, Carter was granted a temporary restraining order against his younger brother Aaron after alleging he threatened to kill his then-pregnant wife. On November 20, the judge made the decision the day after one of Carter's sisters was granted a domestic violence restraining order, and Carter's brother-in-law was granted a harassment restraining order until November 2020.

On February 18, 2022, in a class-action lawsuit filed against the cryptocurrency company SafeMoon that alleged the company is a pump and dump scheme, Carter was named as a defendant along with YouTuber and professional boxer Jake Paul, rappers Soulja Boy and Lil Yachty, and social media personality Ben Phillips for promoting the SafeMoon token on their social media accounts with misleading information. On the same day, the U.S. 11th Circuit Court of Appeals ruled in a lawsuit against Bitconnect that the Securities Act of 1933 extends to targeted solicitation using social media.

Rape allegations
Shannon Ruth
On December 8, 2022, Shannon Ruth filed a lawsuit against Carter alleging that he raped her in 2001 on board the Backstreet Boys' tour bus when she was a 17-year-old fan. The suit alleges that Ruth, who is on the autism spectrum and has cerebral palsy, was waiting to get Carter's autograph following a Backstreet Boys concert at the Tacoma Dome in Tacoma, Washington when Carter invited her inside the bus, where he served her alcohol and then tried to make her perform oral sex on him before ultimately raping her. Ruth also accused Carter of calling her a "retarded little bitch" during the alleged assault, and of threatening to harm her if she told anyone. In a statement by his attorney Michael Holtz, Carter denied the allegation and claimed that Ruth's lawyer had allegedly taken advantage of the situation by manipulating Ruth into making her sexual misconduct allegations about Carter and called the lawsuit a "press stunt" by Ruth's lawyers.

Ruth's complaint includes allegations from three other Jane Does, including a victim who was 15 years old. All four people say that Carter sexually assaulted them and infected them with HPV. All four people also said Carter provided them with alcohol before the assaults.

Following the release of the lawsuit, ABC canceled "A Very Backstreet Holiday," a television special featuring the Backstreet Boys that was scheduled to air the following week on December 14, 2022.

Melissa Schuman
In November 2017, during the #MeToo movement, Melissa Schuman, a former member of the girl group Dream, publicly claimed Carter forced her to have sex against her will. The alleged incident occurred in 2003, when he was 22 and she was 18, according to paperwork filed by the Los Angeles County District Attorney's Office. Schuman stated that Carter provided alcohol and took her virginity by force. Schuman stated that she was emboldened to disclose the incident after observing the similarities to a 2006 rape accusation. Carter denied Schuman's allegation.

2006 incident
In October 2017, Radar Online reported on a March 2006 incident involving a 20-year-old fan at a house party, with information obtained from an incident report from the police department in West Allis, Wisconsin. The alleged victim, whose name was not disclosed, stated that after drinking with Carter and his friend, Rob Kalouch, Carter digitally penetrated her and the two men forced her to perform oral sex. She stated that she refused them, telling them that she had a boyfriend and was "saving herself for marriage". The alleged victim stated that later the two attempted to have sex with her later as she pretended to be asleep. The report stated that afterwards, she was brought to the hospital by her sister, where she was interviewed by police. The victim did not press charges, and Carter refused to speak with investigators regarding the incident.

Melissa Schuman later said in her rape accusation that reading about this alleged incident encouraged her to speak about her own experience.

Substance abuse
Carter has acknowledged ongoing struggles with drug and alcohol abuse. He revealed that he started drinking when he was just two years old and again at nine. He says that he became sober after being diagnosed with cardiomyopathy and realized that he could die if he did not make major lifestyle changes. The singer credits fellow Backstreet Boys member Kevin Richardson for helping him turn his life around by giving him Norman Vincent Peale's book Why Some Positive Thinkers Get Powerful Results. After reading that book he started a healthier lifestyle, saying "Working out definitely helped my self-esteem, and it helped to kind of push it all aside. I just started replacing drinking and the parties... with healthier things like sports, video games."

Carter also appeared on The Ellen DeGeneres Show on February 19, 2009, to talk about his past with drug and alcohol addictions. In December 2011, Carter again appeared on TV to talk about his struggle with drugs and alcohol, this time on The Dr. Phil Show's "Second Chances" special. This segment led to his first book deal with Bird Street Books. In 2013, he published the memoir titled Facing the Music and Living to Talk About It.

Discography

Solo albums
 Now or Never (2002)
 I'm Taking Off (2011)
 All American (2015)

 Collaborative albums
 Nick & Knight'' (2014) (with Jordan Knight)

Awards and nominations

Filmography

See also
 Backstreet Boys

Further reading

References

https://www.usmagazine.com/celebrity-moms/news/nick-carter-wife-lauren-kitt-welcome-their-3rd-child/

External links

 
 
 

 
1980 births
20th-century American male actors
20th-century American singers
21st-century American male actors
21st-century American singers
American child singers
American contemporary R&B singers
American dance musicians
American male child actors
American male dancers
American male film actors
American male guitarists
American male pop singers
American male singers
American male songwriters
American male television actors
American pop guitarists
American pop rock singers
Backstreet Boys members
Child pop musicians
Guitarists from Florida
Guitarists from New York (state)
Jive Records artists
Living people
Male actors from Florida
Male actors from New York (state)
Male actors from Tampa, Florida
Musicians from Tampa, Florida
NKOTBSB members
Participants in American reality television series
People from Jamestown, New York
People from Ruskin, Florida
RCA Records artists
Record producers from Florida
Record producers from New York (state)
Singers from Florida
Singers from New York (state)
Songwriters from Florida
Songwriters from New York (state)